The National Current Party (Hizb Al-Tayar Al-Watani) is a political party established in Jordan in 2009. The current leader of the party is Salah Rsheedat.

Election results

References

2009 establishments in Jordan
Arab nationalism in Jordan
Pan-Arabist political parties
Political parties established in 2009
Political parties in Jordan